Pacific Grove is a coastal city in Monterey County, California, in the United States. The population at the 2020 census was 15,090. Pacific Grove is located between Point Pinos and Monterey.

Pacific Grove has numerous Victorian-era houses, some of which have been turned into bed-and-breakfast inns. The city is the location of the Point Pinos Lighthouse, the Pacific Grove Museum of Natural History and the Asilomar Conference Center. Novelist Robert Louis Stevenson frequented Pacific Grove and wrote of visiting lighthouse-keeper Allen Luce in 1879. Author John Steinbeck resided in Pacific Grove for a number of years. Later, the area was a filming location for A Summer Place starring Sandra Dee, for Roger Spottiswoode's 1989 film Turner & Hooch, and for the TV series Big Little Lies.

History
Pacific Grove was founded in 1875, when David Jacks sold the land to the Pacific Improvement Company, which donated acreage towards the first West Coast Chautauqua retreat formed by a group of Methodists who modeled the town after Ocean Grove, New Jersey. In time, the butterflies, fragrant pines, and fresh sea air brought others to the Pacific Grove Retreat to rest and meditate. The initial camp meeting of the Pacific Coast branch of the Chautauqua Literary and Scientific Circle was held at the Chautauqua Hall in Pacific Grove in June 1879. Modeled after the Methodist Sunday school teachers' training camp established in 1874 at Chautauqua Lake, New York, this location became part of a nationwide educational network.

In November 1879, after the summer campers returned home, Robert Louis Stevenson wandered into the deserted campgrounds: "I have never been in any place so dreamlike. Indeed, it was not so much like a deserted town as like a scene upon the stage by daylight, and with no one on the boards."

The Pacific Grove post office opened in 1886, closed later that year, and was reopened in 1887. Pacific Grove incorporated in 1889.

The El Carmelo Hotel was Pacific Grove's first hotel, opening to guests on May 20, 1887. It was sometimes called the sister of Monterey's Hotel Del Monte. It was located on Lighthouse Avenue between Fountain and Grand avenues and owned by the Pacific Improvement Company (PIC). In 1907, the name changed to the Pacific Grove Hotel. In 1917, the PIC decided to dismantle it and use the wood in the reconstruction of The Lodge at Pebble Beach that had burned down on December 17, 1917. The empty block was sold to W. R. Holman in 1919 to open the Holman Department Store.

Thomas Albert Work built several of the buildings in Pacific Grove, including the three-story Del Mar hotel in 1895, at the corner of Sixteenth, and in 1904 he built a commercial block along Lighthouse Avenue to house local businesses, including the two-story Romanesque-style Bank of Pacific Grove.

Pacific Grove, like Carmel-by-the-Sea and Monterey, became an artists' haven in the 1890s and subsequent period. Artists of the En plein air school in both Europe and the United States were seeking an outdoor venue with natural beauty, and Pacific Grove became a magnet for this movement. William Adam was an English painter who first moved to Monterey and then decided on Pacific Grove for his home in 1906. At about the same time, Eugen Neuhaus, a German painter, arrived in Pacific Grove with his new bride. Charles B. Judson was an artist of aristocratic lineage who painted in Pacific Grove over a long time beginning in 1907; Judson's murals decorate the halls of the California Academy of Sciences in San Francisco.

The Asilomar Conference Grounds are located at the western edge of Pacific Grove. Asilomar opened in 1913 as a YWCA summer retreat; it now belongs to the California State Park System. Thirteen buildings on these grounds were designed by architect Julia Morgan, who also designed Hearst Castle.

For a number of years, John Steinbeck lived in a cottage in Pacific Grove owned by his father, Ernest, who was Monterey County treasurer. The cottage still stands on a quiet side street at 147 11th Street, without any plaque or special sign, virtually overlooked by most Steinbeck fans. Another Steinbeck-related house is at 222 Central Avenue, which was his grandmother's house. A golden statue of Steinbeck in the front yard stood for years before it was removed. In Steinbeck's book Sweet Thursday, a chapter is dedicated to describing a (probably fictional) rivalry that arose among the town's residents over the game of roque.

Local traditions include a Butterfly Parade held in early October to celebrate the return of the monarch butterfly to its wintering habitat. Mid-April, a Good Old Days festival is held downtown, which includes rides, crafts booths, food, entertainment, and a parade. On the last Saturday of July there is a pet parade. Candy Cane Lane is a neighborhood of Morse Dr and Platt Park that is decorated for Christmas each December with an abundance of lights and decorations.  Candy Cane Lane has been a local tradition for more than 60 years.

Historically a form of Illumination Night originally held at Wesleyan Grove, Massachusetts, was held at the closing of Pacific Grove's Chautauqua summer lecture series. This later turned into a popular Obon-style event with a bonfire, music, and boat parade at Lovers Point beach and called the Feast of Lanterns. It culminated in a racist production where Caucasian residents put on yellowface makeup. The event was continuously held in different iterations, with the exception of the two world wars, until 2020. The historical roots of Illumination Night are unknown but are thought to have been popularized by Aestheticism, a popular movement at the time.

Hopkins Marine Station maintains a campus next to the Monterey Bay Aquarium. It was founded in 1892, making it the oldest marine laboratory on the US Pacific Coast, and the second-oldest in the US, after the Marine Biological Laboratory in Woods Hole, Massachusetts. It was originally named the Hopkins Seaside Laboratory, and is located on what is now Lovers Point.

In the 1980s, Pacific Grove was the site of the pioneering microcomputer software company Digital Research. Originally located in Gary Kildall's house on the corner of Lighthouse and Willow, it later moved to offices on Central Avenue.

On October 12, 1997, John Denver died when he crashed into the Pacific Ocean off Pacific Grove in his personal plane.

Pacific Grove was the last dry town in California. Due to the city's religious and gated history, alcohol was not served to the public until July 4, 1969, at the grand opening of the Pacific Grove Art Center by ElMarie Dyke, its founder. This caused much controversy because the law was not to take effect until November of that year. Ironically, ElMarie was also a great proponent for keeping the town dry. To this day, Pacific Grove has very strict laws regarding the service of alcohol and has no stand-alone bars.

At the November 6, 2018, general municipal election, Pacific Grove voters approved Measure M, which prohibits short-term vacation rentals in residential districts outside the Coastal Zone.

Geography and ecology 

Pacific Grove contains several habitat types, including marine, littoral, pine forest, and mixed-oak woodland. The famed breeding habitat for the monarch butterfly is situated in the northwest part of town imbedded in residential neighborhoods in mixed oak forests.

The black-and-orange monarch butterflies spend much of the fall and winter in Monterey pine and eucalyptus trees, roughly from the autumnal equinox through the spring (or vernal) equinox. Most butterflies are protected in the city's Butterfly Sanctuary. City Ordinance No. 352 makes killing or threatening a butterfly a misdemeanor, punishable by a $1,000 fine.

Pacific Grove Marine Gardens State Marine Conservation Area, Lovers Point State Marine Reserve, Edward F. Ricketts State Marine Conservation Area and Asilomar State Marine Reserve are marine protected areas in the waters around Pacific Grove. Like underwater parks, these marine protected areas help conserve ocean wildlife and marine ecosystems. Monterey Bay is a marine protected sanctuary.

The principal noise source in Pacific Grove is State Route 68. There are approximately 800 residents exposed to sound levels of 60 CNEL or above, making Pacific Grove noticeably quieter than its neighbor Monterey, which has more tourist traffic and more through traffic.

The town sits between its two well known neighbors, Pebble Beach and Monterey. Pacific Grove is a favorite vacation getaway for San Francisco Bay Area residents, as it is located two hours south of San Francisco.

The town does not allow development on the waterside of the ocean-front street, so that the beaches and scenic points are unobstructed.

Asilomar, Lovers Point, and the intervening coastline afford surfing, which is challenging due to near-shore rocks, albeit waves are typically moderate in height.

Pacific Grove's climate is mild throughout the year, essentially the same as in neighboring Monterey, with most of the rain falling from November through April. Extreme temperatures are rare, and fog is common, especially in the late night and early morning, all year.

Climate
This region experiences warm and dry summers, with no average monthly temperatures above 71.6 °F. According to the Köppen climate classification, Pacific Grove has a warm-summer Mediterranean climate, Csb on climate maps.

Government
Pacific Grove is governed by a city council consisting of a mayor and six councilmembers, all elected at-large. As of the November 2022 election, the mayor is Bill Peake, and the six councilmembers are: Joe Amelio, Debby Beck, Luke Coletti, Lori McDonnell, Chaps Poduri, and Nick Smith.

At the county level, Pacific Grove is represented on the Monterey County Board of Supervisors by Mary Adams.

Demographics

2010
The 2010 United States Census reported that Pacific Grove had a population of 15,041. The population density was 3,758.1 people/sq mi (1,451.0/km2). The racial makeup of Pacific Grove was 84.5% White, 1.3% African American, 0.5% Native American, 5.8% Asian, 0.3% Pacific Islander, 3.1% from other races, and 4.4% from two or more races. Hispanics or Latinos of any race were 10.7% of the population.

The Census reported that 14,686 people (97.6% of the population) lived in households, 140 (0.9%) lived in noninstitutionalized group quarters, and 215 (1.4%) were institutionalized.

Of the 7,020 households, 21.7% had children under the age of 18 living in them, 41.8% were married couples living together, 9.3% had a female householder with no husband present, 3.3% had a male householder with no wife present. About 5.0% were unmarried opposite-sex partnerships, and 0.8% were same-sex married couples or partnerships. About 37.2% were made up of individuals, and 14.4%had someone living alone who was 65 or older. The average household size was 2.09; the average family size was 2.74.

In the city, the age distribution was 16.5% under 18, 6.6% from 18 to 24, 23.0% from 25 to 44, 32.3% from 45 to 64, and 21.6% who were 65  or older. The median age was 48.1 years. For every 100 females, there were 85.2 males. For every 100 females age 18 and over, there were 81.1 males.

The 8,169 housing units averaged 2,041.1/sq mi (788.1/km2), of which 3,205 (45.7%) were owner-occupied, and 3,815 (54.3%) were occupied by renters. The homeowner vacancy rate was 3.8%; the rental vacancy rate was 4.4%. 7,071 people (47.0% of the population) lived in owner-occupied housing units and 7,615 people (50.6%) lived in rental housing units.

Over 1300 structures were listed on the town's historic register, giving Pacific Grove the largest number of historic homes and structures for its size on the West Coast.

2000
As of the census of 2000,  15,522 people, 7,316 households, and 3,972 families were residing in the city. The population density was 5,399.2 people/sq mi (2,088.2/km2). The 8,032 housing units averaged 2,793.9/sq mi (1,080.5/km2). The racial makeup of the city was 88.04% White, 1.14% African American, 0.55% Native American, 4.50% Asian, 0.26% Pacific Islander, 1.78% from other races, and 3.73% from two or more races. About 7.14% of the population was Hispanic or Latino of any race.

Of the 7,316 households,  21.6% had children under the age of 18 living with them, 41.7% were married couples living together, 9.6% had a female householder with no husband present, and 45.7% were not families. About 36.8% of all households were made up of individuals, and 14.2% had someone living alone who was 65 years of age or older. The average household size was 2.10, and the average family size was 2.75. The age distribution was 17.8% under 18, 5.7% from 18 to 24, 27.0% from 25 to 44, 29.9% from 45 to 64, and 19.6% who were 65  or older. The median age was 45 years. For every 100 females, there were 85.8 males. For every 100 females age 18 and over, there were 81.5 males.

Males had a median income of $43,897 versus $35,924 for females. The per capita income for the city was $31,277. About 3.0% of families and 5.4% of the population were below the poverty line, including 4.6% of those under age 18 and 3.9% of those age 65 or over.

Notable residents

 Mark Bingham, hero on United Airlines Flight 93 downed in Shanksville, Pennsylvania on 9/11 
 Sam Bottoms, actor
 Ernest K. Bramblett, politician
 Eleanor Cameron, author
 Joseph Campbell, mythologist
 Lawrence Henry Chamberlain, academic and administrator
 Mimi Farina, singer, songwriter
 Peter S. Fischer, writer and producer
 Paul Fleischman, author
 Julie Heffernan, artist
 Grace Hibbard, author and poet
 Ben Jealous, NAACP president (2008–2013)
 Janis Joplin, singer
 Slim Keith, socialite and fashion icon
 Gary Kildall, scientist and founder of Digital Research
 Peter Koper, writer and producer
 Henry Littlefield, historian and educator
 Johnny Miller, professional golfer
 Ward Moore, science fiction writer
 Maxine Nightingale, singer
 Greg Norman, golfer
 Julia Platt, mayor
 Arthur Porges, science-fiction writer
 Gina Prince-Bythewood, film director and writer
 Josh Randall, actor
 Clark Ashton Smith, poet, fantasy-fiction writer
 John Steinbeck, author
 Ken Swofford, actor
 Bill Walsh, football coach
 Mare Winningham, actor
 Laurence Yep, children's book author
 Frank Zappa, musician, songwriter

Media

Local radio station KAZU-FM - 90.3 was created by Don Mussel in 1977 in Pacific Grove, but is now located in Seaside, California. Television service for the community comes from the Monterey-Salinas-Santa Cruz designated market area. Local newspapers include The Monterey County Herald and the Monterey County Weekly.

See also
 Coastal California
 List of school districts in Monterey County, California
 List of tourist attractions in Monterey County, California
 Pacific Grove High School
 Candy Cane Lane

References

External links

 

 
Cities in Monterey County, California
Monterey Bay
Populated coastal places in California
Populated places established in 1875
1875 establishments in California
Populated places established in 1889
1889 establishments in California
Incorporated cities and towns in California